Kostin Dol is a village in the municipality of Kočani, North Macedonia.

History
Toponyms  stemming from the name Arnaut, an Ottoman rendering for Albanians, have been found in the village, such as Arnautska Kuќа, the name of a field and Arnautska Žižnica, ruins of an old settlement. This suggests either direct linguistic contact with Albanians or the former presence of an assimilated Albanian community.

Demographics
According to the 2002 census, the village had a total of 20 inhabitants. Ethnic groups in the village include:

Macedonians 20

References

Villages in Kočani Municipality